WABCO can refer to:

Westinghouse Air Brake Company (WABCO)
WABCO Vehicle Control Systems - a part of the former Westinghouse Air Brake Company
WABCO Holdings - companies also created from the former Westinghouse Air Brake Company